Boris Becker was the defending champion but did not compete that year.

Mark Philippoussis won in the final 7–5, 6–3 against Goran Ivanišević.

In one of the semifinals, Goran Ivanišević defeated Greg Rusedski by winning 20–18 in the third set tiebreak. This was considered the longest tiebreak ever played in an ATP tournament and triple tied the record with two Grand Slam matches, Björn Borg against Premjit Lall at the 1973 Wimbledon Championships and Ivanišević himself against Daniel Nestor at the 1993 US Open.

Seeds
The top eight seeds received a bye to the second round.

  Pete Sampras (quarterfinals)
  Michael Chang (second round)
  Goran Ivanišević (final)
  Tim Henman (third round)
  Marc Rosset (second round)
  Mark Philippoussis (champion)
  Jim Courier (third round)
  Jonas Björkman (semifinals)
  Patrick Rafter (quarterfinals)
  Jan Siemerink (first round)
  Todd Woodbridge (second round)
  Cédric Pioline (second round)
  Alex O'Brien (second round)
  Jason Stoltenberg (first round)
  Marc-Kevin Goellner (first round)
  Greg Rusedski (semifinals)

Draw

Finals

Top half

Section 1

Section 2

Bottom half

Section 3

Section 4

References

External links 
 Official results archive (ATP)
 Official results archive (ITF)

Singles